Blaine Schmidt (born August 23, 1963 in Sudbury, Ontario) is a former professional Canadian football guard who played twelve seasons in the Canadian Football League.

Schmidt played CIS football for the Guelph Gryphons.

He played professional football first for the Edmonton Eskimos in 1986, then played the bulk of his career with the Toronto Argonauts from 1987 to 1994, including winning the 79th Grey Cup in 1991. He finished his career playing for the Hamilton Tiger-Cats from 1995 to 1997, when he was named to the 1996 East Division All-Star team.

He retired from football in 1998 and now owns an automotive restoration shop in Erin, Ontario.

References

1963 births
Living people
Canadian football offensive linemen
Edmonton Elks players
Guelph Gryphons football players
Hamilton Tiger-Cats players
Players of Canadian football from Ontario
Sportspeople from Greater Sudbury
Toronto Argonauts players